Lucia Tamagnini (born 23 October 1963) is a Sammarinese politician, Mayor (Capitano di Castello) of Acquaviva since 20 March 2013, when Loretta Mazza resigned.

Tamagnini was born in City of San Marino on 23 October 1963. She was elected city councillor in the 2009 Acquaviva local election.

Her candidacy named Together for Acquaviva won the 2014 local election as was the only candidacy and received the 100% of the valid votes.

References

1963 births
Living people
People from the City of San Marino
Mayors of places in San Marino
Women mayors of places in San Marino
Sammarinese women in politics
21st-century women politicians